Year 986 (CMLXXXVI) was a common year starting on Friday (link will display the full calendar) of the Julian calendar.

Events 
 By place 

 Byzantine Empire 
 August 17 – Battle of the Gates of Trajan: Emperor Basil II leads a Byzantine expeditionary force (30,000 men) against the Bulgarians to capture the fortress city of Sredets. After a siege of 20 days, Basil is forced to retreat from the Sofia Valley towards the town of Ihtiman (through a passage known as the Gate of Trajan). The Bulgarians under Tsar Samuel ambush and defeat the Byzantine forces. Only the elite Varangian Guard escapes with heavy casualties and leads Basil to safety through secondary routes.

 Europe 
 March 2 – King Lothair III (or Lothair IV) dies after a 32-year reign at Laon. He is succeeded by his 19-year-old son Louis V as ruler of the West Frankish Kingdom.
 Summer: Al-Mansur, the de facto ruler of Al-Andalus, continues his effort in the north of the Iberian Peninsula and plunders the city of Coimbra (modern Portugal). 
 Empress Theophanu, accompanied by the 6-year-old King Otto III and Henry II of Bavaria, leads a campaign against Bohemia and the Slavs on the Elbe frontier.
 Mieszko I, duke (de facto) ruler of Poland, pledges his allegiance to Otto III and the Holy Roman Empire. He promises assistance in Otto's war against the Slavs.
 Battle of Hjörungavágr: The Earls of Lade under Haakon Sigurdsson (the Powerful) defeat a Danish invasion force led by the Jomsvikings in western Norway.
 Winter – King Harald II (Bluetooth) dies after a 28-year reign (driven into exile). He is succeeded by his son Sweyn Forkbeard as ruler of Denmark and Norway.

 Arabian Empire 
 Winter – Sabuktigin, emir of the Ghaznavid Dynasty, invades India. He expands the emirate between the Kabul Valley and the Indus River after defeating King Jayapala.

 Asia 
 Emperor Kazan abdicates the throne after a political struggle from the Fujiwara family. He is succeeded by his 6-year-old cousin Ichijō  as the 66th emperor (tennō) of Japan.
 Summer – Chi Go Pass Campaign: The Song Dynasty sends armies on three fronts against the Liao Dynasty in the Sixteen Prefectures, but they are defeated on all fronts.

 By topic 

 Exploration 
 Bjarni Herjólfsson, a Norse-Icelandic merchant captain and explorer, becomes the first inhabitant of the Old World to discover the mainland of the Americas.

 Literature 
 One of the Four Great Books of Song, the Chinese encyclopedia Finest Blossoms in the Garden of Literature is finished, with a total of 1,000 volumes.

Births 
 Al-Qushayri, Persian Sufi scholar and theologian (d. 1072)
 Æthelstan Ætheling, son of Æthelred II (the Unready) (d. 1014)
 Bezprym (or Besfrim), duke of Poland (approximate date)
 Constance of Arles, French queen (approximate date)
 Lê Long Đĩnh, emperor of the Lê Dynasty (d. 1009)
 Poppo, archbishop of Trier (approximate date)
 Reginald I, count palatine of Burgundy (d. 1057)

Deaths 
 March 2 – Lothair III, king of the West Frankish Kingdom (b. 941)
 May 25 – Abd al-Rahman al-Sufi, Persian astronomer (b. 903)
 August – Yang Ye, Chinese general and governor (jiedushi)
 August 15 – Minnborinus, Irish missionary and abbot
unknown date 
 Bahram ibn Ardashir al-Majusi, Buyid official and general
 Cadwallon ab Ieuaf, king of Gwynedd (Wales)
probable 
Æthelstan Mannessune, English landowner
Bobo, Frankish warrior and pilgrim

References